Henry Hawkins, 1st Baron Brampton (1817–1907) was an English judge.

Henry Hawkins may also refer to:

Henry Hawkins (politician) (1790–1845), American politician from New York
Henry Hawkins (cricketer) (1876–1930), English cricketer
Henry Hawkins (Jesuit) (1577–1646), English devotional writer
Ezra Pound (1885–1972), who used this name as a pen-name

See also

Harry Hawkins (disambiguation)